The murders of Ming Qu and Ying Wu occurred on April 11, 2012, when the two Chinese graduate students were shot to death when sitting in their 2003 BMW parked one mile outside of the University of Southern California (USC) campus in Los Angeles, California. It sparked safety concerns around the campus in South Los Angeles, an area notorious for its history of crime-ridden neighborhoods.

The two suspects, Javier Bolden and Bryan Barnes, aged 19 and 20 at the time of the shooting, were arrested in connection with the murders. In 2014, Barnes was found guilty of murder and sentenced to life imprisonment without parole. In October of the same year, Bolden was also found guilty, and in November was sentenced to life imprisonment without parole.

Details
On April 11, 2012, at 1:00 a.m., students Ming Qu and Ying Wu were shot to death after sitting in their parked 2003 BMW on the 2700 block of Raymond Avenue, located one mile northwest from the University of Southern California campus. After noticing two African American men with guns approaching them in the car, Qu managed to get out of the car and run to a nearby home where he pounded on the door but was shot several times in the head. Wu was killed by a single shot to the chest while she was sitting in the front passenger's seat. At the time of the shooting, it was raining heavily, creating challenging conditions at the crime scene. Qu and Wu were both taken to California Hospital Medical Center in downtown Los Angeles, where they were both pronounced dead on arrival. The two 23-year-old students were both from Mainland China and were studying electrical engineering.

Arrests
Police traced a cell phone taken by the perpetrators from the scene of the shooting. On May 18, 2012, that led to the arrest of Bryan Barnes, 20 years old, who was living near USC's campus in the South Los Angeles area. A second suspect, 19-year-old Javier Bolden, a resident of Palmdale, was detained that day. They were both charged with two counts of murder. Bolden and Barnes were also charged with attempted murder in an unrelated shooting in December 2011 at a party in South Los Angeles, which left a woman seriously wounded and a man paralyzed. Officials also suspect Barnes of firing multiple rounds at a party on February 12, wounding a 20-year-old man. The two are eligible for the death penalty according to prosecutors.

Aftermath

Legal proceedings
Bryan Barnes pled guilty to two counts of murder on February 25, 2014, and was immediately sentenced to life in prison without possibility of parole. Barnes also admitted two so-called special circumstances that could have made him eligible for the death penalty. Co-defendant Javier Bolden was convicted in October 2014 and sentenced to life without parole.

Response
About one thousand people gathered at a memorial in mourning for the two victims at the Shrine Auditorium the following week of the shooting. Los Angeles Chinese Consul General Qiu Shaofang made the following statement: "The ministry of foreign affairs, ministry of education and the Consulate General of the People’s Republic of China in Los Angeles acted immediately after the tragedy happened and have committed  [to] join efforts in tackling problems arising from the incident." Los Angeles Mayor Antonio Villaraigosa made a response to the attack sending his condolences.

Criticism
The area surrounding University of Southern California's campus is an urban, low income community that has a historically high hate crime rate. The parents of the two students filed a lawsuit against the school for misrepresenting security on campus.  The lawsuit was dismissed by Los Angeles County Superior Court Judge Michael Johnson in February 2013.  Johnson found no connection between the killings and the university's self-reported efforts to protect students, stating that "causation is an insurmountable issue for the plaintiffs."

See also
 List of homicides in California

References

Murder in Los Angeles
People murdered in California
Deaths by firearm in California
2012 murders in the United States
2012 in California
People murdered in Los Angeles
Crimes in Los Angeles
Murdered students
Chinese people murdered abroad
Anti-Chinese sentiment in the United States
Anti-Chinese violence in the United States
Asian-American-related controversies
April 2012 crimes in the United States